This national electoral calendar for 2021 lists the national/federal elections held in 2021 in all sovereign states and their dependent territories. By-elections are excluded, though national referendums are included.

January
10 January:
Kazakhstan, Assembly
Kyrgyzstan, President and Referendum
14 January: Uganda, President and Parliament
24 January: Portugal, President

February
7 February:
Ecuador, President (1st round) and Parliament
Liechtenstein, Parliament
14 February: Kosovo, Parliament
19 February: Turks and Caicos Islands, Legislature
21 February:
Laos, Parliament
Niger, President (2nd round)
28 February: El Salvador, Parliament

March
2 March: Federated States of Micronesia, Parliament
6 March: Ivory Coast, National Assembly
7 March: Switzerland, Referendums
14 March: Central African Republic, Parliament (2nd round)
15–17 March: Netherlands, House of Representatives
17 March: Saint Helena, Referendum
19 March: Curaçao, Legislature
21 March: Republic of Congo, President
23 March: Israel, Parliament

April
4 April: Bulgaria, Parliament
6 April: Greenland, Parliament
9 April:
Djibouti, President
Samoa, Parliament
11 April:
Benin, President
Chad, President
Ecuador, President (2nd round)
Kyrgyzstan, Constitutional Referendum
Peru, President (1st round) and Parliament
14 April: Cayman Islands, Legislature
18 April: Cape Verde, Parliament
25 April: Albania, Parliament

May
15–16 May: Chile, Constituent Assembly
23 May: Vietnam, Parliament
26 May: Syria, President
30 May: Cyprus, Parliament
31 May: Somaliland, House of Representatives

June
6 June:
Mexico, Chamber of Deputies
Peru, President (2nd round)
9 June: Mongolia, President
12 June: Algeria, Parliament
13 June: Switzerland, Referendums
18 June: Iran, President
20 June: Armenia, Parliament
21–22 June: Ethiopia, House of Representatives (1st stage)
24 June: Gibraltar, Referendum
25 June: Aruba, Parliament

July
11 July:
Bulgaria, Parliament
Moldova, Parliament
Slovenia, Referendum
18 July: São Tomé and Príncipe, President (1st round)
26 July: Saint Lucia, House of Assembly

August
1 August: Mexico, Referendum
12 August: Zambia, President and Parliament

September
5 September: São Tomé and Príncipe, President (2nd round)
8 September: Morocco, House of Representatives
12 September: Macau, Legislature
13 September: Norway, Parliament
16 September: The Bahamas, House of Assembly
17–19 September: Russia, State Duma
20 September: Canada, House of Commons
23 September: Isle of Man, House of Keys
25 September: Iceland, Parliament
26 September:
Germany, Bundestag
San Marino, Referendum
Switzerland, Referendums
30 September: Ethiopia, House of Representatives (2nd stage)

October
2 October: Qatar, Consultative Assembly
8–9 October: Czech Republic, Chamber of Deputies
10 October: Iraq, Parliament
13 October: Saint Helena, Legislative Council
17 October: Cape Verde, President
24 October: Uzbekistan, President
31 October: Japan, House of Representatives and

November
4 November: Falkland Islands, Legislature
7 November: Nicaragua, President and Parliament
13 November: Nauru, Referendum
14 November:
Argentina, Chamber of Deputies and Senate
Bulgaria, President (1st round) and Parliament
18 November: Tonga, Parliament
21 November:
Bulgaria, President (2nd round)
Chile, President (1st round), Chamber of Deputies and Senate
28 November:
Honduras, President and Parliament
Kyrgyzstan, Parliament
Switzerland, Referendums

December
4 December: The Gambia, President
12 December:
New Caledonia, Independence Referendum
Transnistria, President
18 December: Taiwan, Referendum
19 December:
Chile, President (2nd round)
Hong Kong, Legislature

Indirect elections
The following indirect elections of heads of state and the upper houses of bicameral legislatures are scheduled to take place through votes in elected lower houses, unicameral legislatures, or electoral colleges:
30 January and 6 February: Gabon, 
3 March: Pakistan, Senate
22 March: Laos, 
28 March: Turkmenistan, People's Council
1 April: San Marino, Captains Regent
3–4 April: Kosovo, President
5 April: Vietnam, 
2 June: Israel, President
29 July – 13 November: Somalia, Senate
30–31 August: Estonia, President
17 September: San Marino, Captains Regent
19 September: Hong Kong, Election Committee
26 September: Austria, Federal Council (only Upper Austria seats)
5 October: Morocco, 
20 October: Barbados, President
22 October: Fiji, President

See also 
List of elections in 2021

External links
 IFES Election Guide – Elections
 National Democratic Institute – Electoral Calendar

References 

National
National
Political timelines of the 2020s by year
National